Domain reduction algorithms are algorithms used to reduce constraints and degrees of freedom in order to provide solutions for partial differential equations.

References

Algorithms